Kevin DeYoung (born 1977) is an American Reformed theologian and author. He is currently the senior pastor at Christ Covenant Church, in Matthews, North Carolina. The church he previously pastored, University Reformed Church (East Lansing, Michigan), shifted to the Presbyterian Church in America in March 2015 after having been a member of the Reformed Church in America.

DeYoung is a member of The Gospel Coalition's Council. He also contributes articles to various other evangelical organizations, such as World, 9Marks, and Desiring God.

Early life 
DeYoung was born in South Holland, Illinois, and largely grew up in Jenison, Michigan, where his parents Lee and Sheri DeYoung worked for Words of Hope - an international media ministry based in Grand Rapids, Michigan. Both of his grandfathers were from Dutch Reformed backgrounds.

Education
DeYoung graduated summa cum laude from Hope College in Michigan in 1999 and then received his M.Div. from Gordon-Conwell Theological Seminary in Massachusetts in 2002. He completed a Ph.D. in Early Modern History focusing on the theology of John Witherspoon at the University of Leicester (John Coffey served as his adviser), successfully defending his Ph.D. thesis on January 10, 2019.

Career
DeYoung first served as a pastor at First Reformed Church in Orange City, Iowa. From August 2004 to June 2017 he served as senior pastor at University Reformed Church in East Lansing, Michigan, near Michigan State University.

DeYoung has authored or co-authored many books and articles; his book Why We're Not Emergent (co-authored with Ted Kluck) won the 2009 Christianity Today book award. His book Why We Love the Church (also co-authored with Ted Kluck) won the 2010 Christianity Today Book Award and Leadership Journal Golden Canon Book Award. Crazy Busy: A (Mercifully) Short Book about a (Really) Big Problem was awarded the 2014 Christian Book of the Year by the Evangelical Christian Publishers Association (ECPA).

DeYoung is a member of the Gospel Coalition Council with Tim Keller, John Piper, and others.

He has been a keynote speaker to at conferences including Together for the Gospel, The Gospel Coalition, Shepherd’s Conference, and many more.

DeYoung joined the faculty at Reformed Theological Seminary Charlotte in 2017 as an Assistant Professor. On June 1, 2021, he was promoted to Associate Professor of Systematic Theology.

Written Works
Freedom and Boundaries: A Pastoral Primer on the Role of Women in the Church (2006)
Why We're Not Emergent: By Two Guys Who Should Be, co-authored with Ted Kluck (2008)
Why We Love the Church: In Praise of Institutions and Organized Religion, co-authored with Ted Kluck (2009)
Just Do Something: A Liberating Approach to Finding God's Will (2009)
The Good News We Almost Forgot: Rediscovering the Gospel in a 16th Century Catechism (2010)
Why Our Church Switched to the ESV (2011), 31-page booklet
What Is the Mission of the Church?: Making Sense of Social Justice, Shalom, and the Great Commission, co-authored with Greg Gilbert (2011)
Don't Call It a Comeback: The Old Faith for a New Day (The Gospel Coalition) (2011)
The Holy Spirit (The Gospel Coalition Booklets) (2011)
The Hole in Our Holiness: Filling the Gap between Gospel Passion and the Pursuit of Godliness (2012)
The Gospel as Center: Renewing Our Faith and Reforming Our Ministry Practices (The Gospel Coalition) (2012)
Crazy Busy: A (Mercifully) Short Book about a (Really) Big Problem (2013)
Acting the Miracle: God's Work and Ours in the Mystery of Sanctification (contributed) (2013)
Taking God At His Word: Why the Bible Is Knowable, Necessary, and Enough, and What That Means for You and Me (April 2014)
What Does the Bible Really Teach about Homosexuality? (April 2015)
The Biggest Story: How the Snake Crusher Brings Us Back to the Garden, illustrated by Don Clark (August 2015)
The Art of Turning: From Sin to Christ for a Joyfully Clear Conscience (June 2017)
The Biggest Story ABC, illustrated by Don Clark (August 2017)
Acts: A Visual Guide, illustrated by Chris Ranson (May 2018)
The Ten Commandments: What They Mean, Why They Matter, and Why We Should Obey Them (Foundational Tools for Our Faith) (October 2018)
Grace Defined and Defended: What a 400-Year-Old Confession Teaches Us about Sin, Salvation, and the Sovereignty of God (April, 2019)
The Religious Formation of John Witherspoon: Calvinism, Evangelicalism, and the Scottish Enlightenment (February, 2020)
Men and Women in the Church: A Short, Biblical, Practical Introduction (April, 2021)
The Biggest Story Bible Storybook, illustrated by Don Clark (March, 2022)
The Lord's Prayer: Learning from Jesus on What, Why, and How to Pray, (forthcoming: May, 2022)
Justification and Regeneration: Practical Writings on Saving Faith, notes on the original John Witherspoon-authored text (forthcoming: May, 2022)

References

External links
Official website

1977 births
20th-century Calvinist and Reformed theologians
21st-century Calvinist and Reformed theologians
Alumni of the University of Leicester
American Calvinist and Reformed theologians
American evangelicals
American Presbyterian ministers
Christian bloggers
Gordon–Conwell Theological Seminary alumni
Hope College alumni
Living people
People from Jenison, Michigan
People from South Holland, Illinois
Presbyterian Church in America ministers